KWNO (1230 AM) is an American radio station which first went on the air in 1938.  It was the first local radio station in Winona, Minnesota.  It was Winona's only station until 1957.

It is owned by Leighton Broadcasting, through licensee Leighton Radio Holdings, Inc., and is located at 752 Bluffview Circle, with its other sister stations, KHWK, KGSL, KWMN, and KRIV-FM.

External links
Winona Radio

Radio stations in Minnesota
Radio stations established in 1938
News and talk radio stations in the United States
Winona, Minnesota